Dicyrtoma hageni is a species of globular springtails in the family Dicyrtomidae.

References

Collembola
Animals described in 1896